Deinococcus (from the , deinos, "dreadful, strange" and κόκκος, kókkos, "granule") is in the monotypic family Deinococcaceae, and one genus of three in the order Deinococcales of the bacterial phylum Deinococcota highly resistant to environmental hazards. These bacteria have thick cell walls that give them Gram-positive stains, but they include a second membrane and so are closer in structure to Gram-negative bacteria. Deinococcus survive when their DNA is exposed to high doses of gamma and UV radiation. Whereas other bacteria change their structure in the presence of radiation, such as by forming endospores, Deinococcus tolerate it without changing their cellular form and do not retreat into a hardened structure. They are also characterized by the presence of the carotenoid pigment deinoxanthin that give them their pink color. They are usually isolated according to these two criteria. In August 2020, scientists reported that bacteria from Earth, particularly Deinococcus bacteria, were found to survive for three years in outer space, based on studies conducted on the International Space Station. These findings support the notion of panspermia, the hypothesis that life exists throughout the Universe, distributed in various ways, including space dust, meteoroids, asteroids, comets, planetoids or contaminated spacecraft.

Molecular signatures 
Members of Deinococcus can be distinguished from all other bacteria through molecular signatures known as conserved signature indels (CSIs) and proteins (CSPs). An earlier study on Deinococcus identified nine CSIs and 58 CSPs which were exclusively shared by members of this genus. Some of the identified CSPs such as the DNA damage repair protein PprA and the single-stranded DNA-binding protein DdrB are thought to have functional roles in the DNA repair mechanism and radioresistance phenotype of Deinococcus.

In a more recent work focused on DNA repair proteins an additional 22 CSIs were identified as specific to this genus, including a 30 amino acid insert in the UvrA1 protein that is suggested to play in a role in the resistance ability of Deinococcus species against radiation and oxidation damage.

The uvrA1 gene in Deinococcus was found to form a novel genetic linkage with the genes of the proteins dCSP-1 (a transmembrane protein found only in Deinococcus species), DsbA and DsbB. The latter two proteins play a central role in the formation of disulfide bonds in proteins via oxidation-reduction of cysteine rich motifs (CXXC). The above cluster of genes forms a novel operon unique to Deinococcus species and the encoded proteins are predicted to function together to combat against DNA damage caused by reactive oxidative species from radiation.

The 30 aa CSI present in UvrA1 and another 5-7 aa CSI present in DsbA are located on surface loops of the proteins. The surface exposed loops/patches formed by these CSIs are thought to mediate protein-protein interactions with the transmembrane protein dCSP-1, thus facilitating a sequence of electron transfers that ultimately ameliorates oxidative damage.

Taxonomy

The currently accepted taxonomy is based on the List of Prokaryotic names with Standing in Nomenclature (LPSN)  and National Center for Biotechnology Information (NCBI). , there were 47 species of Deinococcus described

Unassigned species:

 "D. aestuarii" Yin et al. 2022
 "D. aquivivus" Kaempferet al. 2008
 "D. gammatolerans" Srinivasan, Kang & Kim 2017
 "D. guangxiensis" Sun et al. 2009
 "D. koreense" Kim, Kang & Srinivasan 2017
 "D. populi" Li, Kudo & Tonouchi 2018
 "D. sahariens" Bouraoui et al. 2012
 "D. soli" Zhang et al. 2011 non Cha et al. 2016
 "D. xianganensis" Zheng et al. 2014
 D. xibeiensis Wang et al. 2010

Comparative genomics 

Although all species of the genus Deinococcus are related by definition, they exhibit substantial differences across their genomes. Most species appear to have about 3,000 genes, but only a fraction of them are shared in other species. For example, a 3-species comparison among D. radiodurans, D. deserti, and D. geothermalis shows that about two thirds of each genome is shared by all three species, but close to a third is specific and only found in one of the species (see figure). Once more genomes are included in such comparisons, the core genome will almost certainly be much smaller.

Phylogeny

See also
 List of bacteria genera
 List of bacterial orders

References

Bacteria genera
Polyextremophiles
Deinococcales